A tidal atlas or a tidal stream atlas is used to predict the direction and speed of tidal currents.

A tidal atlas usually consists of a set of 12 or 13 diagrams, one for each hour of the tidal cycle, for a coastal region. Each diagram uses arrows to indicate the direction of the flow at that time. The speed of the flow may be indicated by numbers on each arrow or by the length of the arrow. Areas of slack water may be indicated by no arrows or the words "slack water". UK Admiralty Tidal Atlases show speed in units of tenth of a knot.

An alternative to a tidal atlas is a nautical chart that provides tidal diamonds.

Tides
Navigation